Kasper Björkqvist (born 10 July 1997) is a Finnish professional ice hockey winger who is currently playing for the Oulun Kärpät in the Liiga. He was selected by the Pittsburgh Penguins in the second round, 61st overall, of the 2016 NHL Entry Draft.

Playing career
Björkqvist played as a youth with hometown club, the Espoo Blues, and after collecting MVP honors as a prolific scorer in the Nuorten SM-liiga he was selected in the second-round, 61st overall, of the 2016 NHL Entry Draft by the Pittsburgh Penguins.

Moving to North America, Björkqvist continued his development by committing to a collegiate career with Providence College of the Hockey East. He was signed to a two-year, entry-level contract with the Penguins following his junior season with the Friars on 15 May 2019.

In his first professional season in 2019–20, Björkqvist was assigned by Pittsburgh to AHL affiliate, the Wilkes-Barre/Scranton Penguins, appearing in just 6 games before sustaining a season-ending shoulder injury.

In the pandemic delayed  season, Björkqvist opted to remain in Finland to continue his development in joining Liiga club, KooKoo, on loan from the Penguins on 24 August 2020. He enjoyed a productive stint in the Liiga, leading all rookies in league scoring with 26 points through 44 regular season games to earn rookie of the year honors. He returned to the AHL following KooKoo playoff defeat, postingi 1 goal through 5 regular season games.

As a restricted free agent with the Penguins, Björkqvist was re-signed to a one-year, two-way contract on 25 July 2021. In the following  season, having started the campaign in the AHL, Björkqvist was recalled by Pittsburgh and made his NHL debut, scoring his first NHL goal, in a 8-5 victory over the San Jose Sharks on 2 January 2022.

As an impending restricted free agent with the Penguins, Björkqvist opted to return to his homeland, agreeing to a two-year contract with Kärpät of the Liiga on 28 June 2022.

Career statistics

Regular season and playoffs

International

Awards and honors

References

External links

1997 births
Living people
Finnish ice hockey forwards
KooKoo players
Sportspeople from Espoo
Pittsburgh Penguins draft picks
Pittsburgh Penguins players
Providence Friars men's ice hockey players
Wilkes-Barre/Scranton Penguins players